Brodski Varoš is a village in municipality of Slavonski Brod in Brod-Posavina County, Croatia. The town is notable for being the birthplace of Đuro Đaković, a prominent labor rights activist and communist revolutionary in Yugoslavia between two World Wars. More recently, Brodski Varoš has gained attention as the residence of Klepetan and Malena, a mating pair of storks whose relationship was covered by the media, raising public interest in the lives of migratory birds.

History 
Brodski Varoš was settled by German Protestants in the 1800s.

References

Populated places in Brod-Posavina County